Pam Evans (born 1953), is an American marketing executive, and part-time author, columnist, and speaker. Pam is the author of a biography, Ring EXchange - Adventures of a Multiple Marrier (2012). 

Pam was born in Kentucky, raised outside a small town in Western North Carolina, spent her adolescence in Long Island, New York, and her early adulthood in upstate New York. She received her bachelor's degree in English with a minor in Psychology from The University at Albany-SUNY, State University of New York. Pam has worked in the marketing and sales support sectors of global Fortune 500 high technology companies in Silicon Valley for the past 20+ years. Pam is also recognized for her authentic and dynamic public speaking ability.  Pam Evans lives in the San Francisco Bay Area in Northern California.

References

External links

Ring EXChange Blog and Website - Pam Evans' official blog and website on ring-exchange.com
Ring EXchange on Facebook - Pam Evans' book page on facebook.com
Ring EXchange on LinkedIn - Pam Evans' book page on linkedin.com
Ring EXchange on Twitter - Pam Evans' book page on twitter.com
Ring EXchange at CreateSpace - Paperback store at createspace.com
Ring EXchange at Amazon - Paperback store on amazon.com
Ring EXchange at Amazon UK - Paperback store on amazon.com.uk
Ring EXchange at SmashWords - E-Book store on smashwords.com

1953 births
University at Albany, SUNY alumni
American women writers
Living people
21st-century American women